List of Slovenian politicians:

A 
Juro Adlešič
Fran Albreht

B 
Andrej Bajuk
Engelbert Besednjak
Janez Bleiweis
Katja Boh
József Borovnyák
France Bučar

C 
Ivan Cankar

D 
Stane Dolanc

E 
Andrej Einspieler
Josip Ferfolja

G 
Andrej Gosar

H 
Ivan Hribar
Marjan Hribar

I

J 
Zoran Janković
Janez Janša
Iztok Jarc
Zmago Jelinčič Plemeniti
Romana Jordan Cizelj
Aurelio Juri

K 
Franc Kangler
Edvard Kardelj
Stane Kavčič
Franci Kek
Boris Kidrič
Roman Kirn
József Klekl
Anton Korošec
Sergej Kraigher
Janez Evangelist Krek
Miha Krek
Etbin Kristan
Milan Kučan

L 
Karel Lavrič
Dragotin Lončar

M 
Matija Majar
Drago Marušič
Tomaž Marušič

N 
Marko Natlačen
Anton Novačan
Ljudmila Novak

P 
Borut Pahor
Lojze Peterle
Janez Podobnik
Janez Potočnik
Albin Prepeluh
Janko Prunk
Jože Pučnik

R 
Ciril Ribičič
Mitja Ribičič
Anton Rop
Dimitrij Rupel

S 
József Szakovics
Ljubo Sirc
Franc Snoj

Š 
Matjaž Šinkovec
Jožef Školč
Lovro Šturm
Ivan Šušteršič

T 
Ivan Tavčar
Vilmos Tkálecz

V 
Ivo Vajgl
Josip Vilfan
Bogomil Vošnjak
Josip Vošnjak
Anton Vratuša

Z 
Jure Zupan
Milan Zver

Ž 
Gregor Žerjal